Edwin Colón Zayas (October 27, 1965), is a Puerto Rican cuatro player from Puerto Rico.  He joins a large number of Puerto Rican artists,  "innovative tradition-bearing," who focus their talents in extolling the virtues of the Puerto Rican creole and Jíbaro way of life.

Early life

Zayas was born on October 27, 1965 in the town of Orocovis, Puerto Rico to a family of musicians and folklorists.  He was the eldest of five children.  At age six, he began training with the Cuatro and the guitar with his parents. He later taught his brother and two sisters to play several jíbaro instruments, and they have performed with their brother's band.

Early career
 
In the 1980s, Zayas, the cuatrista, and arranger joined bands like the Jataca, Cimarrón, Areyto, Cumbre Criolla, Taller Boricua, the orchestra of Rafael de Jesús, Mapeyé, and the group of Andrés Jiménez.  In 1982, he received the award, "Primer Premio Nacional del Cuatro," and his band, the Conjunto Típico de la Montaña, got the Medal of Culture from the Institute of the Puerto Rican Culture.

The 1990s and Zayas' neo-folklore

In 1991, Zayas was the leading soloist in the San Juan Pops Orchestra in the Center of Fine Arts. That same year, he offered a Cuatro concert in the International Festival of the Guitar at the University of Puerto Rico. And, was sent to represent Puerto Rico in Mexico at the International Cervantes Festival. The next year, Zayas played his Cuatro with the famous guitar player Paco de Lucía in the Theater La Perla in Ponce as well as in the Center for Fine Arts, an event that coincided with the celebrations of the Fifth Centenary of the Encounter of Two Worlds. In 1994, Zayas and his band, "Taller Campesino," joined with the Smithsonian Folklife Festival for a series of performances at the DC Mall, and followed with a US tour. That year, he also participated in the Banco Popular's Christmas program with a runaway piece called, "Duelo de los Cuatros," with Pedrito Guzmán.

The 2000s and later
In 2008, Zayas received a Latin Grammy nomination for Best Traditional Tropical Album for his album Reafirmación, and in 2009 was awarded a National Heritage Fellowship by the National Endowment of the Arts. Zayas remains at the head of the band "Taller Campesino", which continues to receive awards for its innovations and artistic leadership. While he includes nontraditional instruments to his folk music, he is still "considered by many to be among the purest performers of folk music". Zayas expressed his position about the power of folk culture to transform others: “I can... criollizar [creolize] any international number".

Partial discography
As of 2009, Zayas has recorded 17 solo albums and has performed on, arranged, or directed more than 250 recordings for other Puerto Rican artists.

 El cuatro Más allá de lo imaginable (1988, EC Records)
 Siguiendo hacia lo infinito (1989,  EC)
 100 años con Don Felo (1990, EC)
 En vivo desde el Teatro Tapia (1991, EC)
 100% puertorriqueño (1992, EC)
 Bien jíbaro: Country Music of Puerto Rico (1993, Rounder Records)
 Descarga (1993, EC)
 El cuatro y la danza puertorriqueña (1993, Disco Hit Records)
 Este es tu Taller Campesino (1994, Disco Hit)
 Morel Campos en tiempo de cuatro (1995, Disco Hit)
 La hora de tu partida (1999)

See also

List of Puerto Ricans
Andrés Jiménez, "el Jíbaro"
Yomo Toro
Tomás Rivera Morales
Puerto Rican cuatro
Music of Puerto Rico
Bordonua
Puerto Rican Tiples
Iluminado Davila Medina

References

External links

The Puerto Rican Cuatro, featuring Zayas (from www.topix.com)
Folk Festival Opens with Music from Puerto Rico (Kent State University)
Dr. Jose Antonio Lopez And Maestro Edwin Colon Zayas Performance 2 On Classical Guitar And Quatro (Guitar.com) 
Los grandes cuatristas internacionales 

1965 births
People from Orocovis, Puerto Rico
Puerto Rican composers
Puerto Rican male composers
Puerto Rican-cuatro players
American folk musicians
Puerto Rican artists
Living people
National Heritage Fellowship winners